The coat of arms of Finland is a crowned lion on a red field, the right foreleg replaced with an armoured human arm brandishing a sword, trampling on a sabre with the hindpaws. The coat of arms was originally created around the year 1580.

Background

The lion in Nordic heraldry 

The heraldic lion is quite common in Western Europe, and several European countries incorporate it into their national coats of arms. In Nordic heraldry, the lion is first found in the coat of arms of Denmark in the later part of the 12th century.

Starting in the 13th century, the territory of today's Finland was gradually incorporated into the Swedish kingdom, and this coincided with the period when coats of arms first came into use in northern Europe. The first known use of the lion in Sweden was on the royal seals of Erik Knutsson (died 1216) and Erik Eriksson (1216–50), who used two and three lions on their seal, respectively. The first king of the House of Bjelbo, Valdemar Birgersson (1239–1302), also used 3 lions on his seal (Figure 2).

Finland as a duchy 

Bengt Birgersson, the first Duke of Finland (1254–91, Duke from 1284 until 1291), and Valdemar Magnusson, the second Duke (died 1318, Duke of Finland from 1302 until 1317), both used the later Folkunga coat of arms, which was a crowned lion rampant with three bends sinister, the main difference being that Valdemar's arms had the field strewn with hearts (Figure 3). This version of the arms was quite similar to the modern coat of arms of Finland, but the lion did not yet brandish any weapon.

Creation 

When John III assumed the title of "Grand Duke of Finland and Karelia", shortened to Grand Duke of Finland in 1577 (or soon thereafter), the lion became closely associated with Finland through the grand-ducal coats of arms (Figure 5). The grand-ducal coat of arms is thought to have resulted out of a combination of the Göta lion (originating from the Folkunga lion) and the arms of Karelia (Figure 6). The result was that the lion brandishes one weapon and treads on another.

The best-known version of the grand-ducal coat of arms is found on the tomb of Gustavus I (1523–60) in the Uppsala cathedral (Figure 5). It has been suggested that either Duke John himself, or his brother Eric XIV, was leading the design work on the heraldic signs on the tomb. Neither statement can be confirmed, but it is known that Eric XIV showed an interest in heraldry. The monument was commissioned from Guillaume Boyen (Willem Boy), a Flemish architect and sculptor who had worked in Sweden. He started on the task in Antwerp in 1562, completing it 10 years later; however, the tomb was not in place in Uppsala until the early 1580s, and the finishing work lasted until 1591. In addition to the royal arms of Sweden and those of Finland, the arms of the 11 provinces are depicted. From Finland they include North and South Finland, as well as Tavastia and Karelia. The work of Willem Boy is of exceptional quality, which is perhaps explained by the fact that lions were a dominant feature in the heraldry of Flanders, and he would therefore have had a great deal of exposure to it before receiving the commission for the tomb of Gustavus I.

The earliest known blazon from this period states that the arms of Finland represents A crowned lion of gold holding a sword in the right forepaw and trampling with both hindpaws on a Russian sabre (ryssesabel), surrounded by nine silver roses in a red field, over the shield a golden crown with a red cap. As both King Gustavus I and his son, John III, were involved in lengthy wars with Russia, it should come as no surprise that this was a central element in the arms of both the Grand Duchy of Finland, and in that of the coat of arms of the Finnish province of Karelia (Figure 6), which symbolizes the struggle between East and West.

The purpose of the nine roses remains unknown, but are now mostly considered to be decorative only. They have sometimes been claimed to represent the nine historical provinces of Finland, but this hypothesis has not found support among prominent scholars. The number of towns in the nominal "Grand Duchy of Finland and Karelia" in 1580 was also nine, but no known historical research provides support for a link between the number of roses and the number of towns in Finland in 1580.

Evolution

Swedish era 

During the following centuries, the arms of Finland were to appear in different versions of varying artistic quality, and it was only in the late 19th century when the Uppsala lion was again taken into use as the prototype for the coat of arms of Finland.

The lion experienced several changes during the 17th century. In the funeral banner of Charles X Gustavus (in 1660) it can be seen treading on the sabre with all three free paws; in drawings by Elias Brenner (in the Suecia antique et hodierna by Erik Dahlberg, printed in 1716), it is pictured with a double tail (queue fourchée) and with an almost walking posture.

Russian era

After Finland had been ceded to Russia (as a consequence of the Swedish–Russian war of 1808–1809), Elias Brenner's version of the lion was chosen by the authorities as the model for the new coat of arms of the Grand Principality of Finland in the Russian Empire. The blazon in the decree of 26 October 1809 states: The shield has a red field, strewn with roses of silver, on which a golden lion with a crown of gold, standing on a silver saber, which it grasps with the left forepaw while holding in the right forepaw an upright sword. Obviously, any interpretation of the lion as trampling on a Russian sabre had been lost at this point in time.

During the reform of the Russian official heraldry in 1857, the lion was again changed on the initiative of Baron Bernhard Karl von Köhne. The blazon states: On a red field strewn with silver roses a crowned lion of gold, holding in the right forepaw an upright sword and in the left one a curved sword on which it rests with the right hindpaw. The main changes were that the lion had started to resemble a dog rather than a lion, and the crown on top of the shield had been changed to an arched crown without a cap, and with a small Russian eagle on the rim. The sword in the right forepaw had shrunk in size, to the point of resembling a dagger rather than a sword (Figure 8).

During the years when the Russian emperors attempted russification of Finland (1899–1905 and 1908–17), the use of the arms of Finland increased significantly, and eventually became popular in the broader population.

The director of the Finnish National Archives, Karl August Bomansson (1827–1906), made the first significant study on the arms of Finland in modern times. He restored the appearance of the arms in 1886, so that it closely resembled the Uppsala lion. However, there was a slight deviation on how the lion tramples on the saber, and the arched crown with the imperial eagle in the von Köhne version was replaced with a crown similar to that of a German princely crown. This version of the arms was subsequently used in the early years of Finnish independence.

Early independence 

During the 1920s and 1930s, the national arms became the subject of some controversy, and the debate centered on whether the lion should be replaced with a bear, which had an important place in the national folklore. Already in 1557, the bear had emerged as the emblem of Finnia Septentrionalis ("North Finland", at the time roughly the same as Satakunta and northern Southwest Finland) and continues to be used as the coat of arms of Satakunta. However, outside Finland, the bear was usually regarded as a symbol of Russia. The debate was however not settled, and throughout most of the 20th century, versions of the arms were used that closely adhered to the Uppsala lion.

In 1936, a state committee suggested a compromise that Finland should have a "greater" and a "smaller" coat of arms. The greater coat of arms was proposed to have two bears as supporters of the arms (Figure 9), with a base of spruce twigs and with the motto vapaa, vankka, vakaa ("free, firm, steadfast"). This would have given the bear a place in the national heraldry, but the design was never confirmed, nor was this version of the arms taken into use.

Today 

The blazon of the national coat of arms was finally settled in 1978, when the law of 26 May 1978 (381/78) described the coat of arms as follows: On a red field, a crowned lion, the right forepaw replaced with an armoured hand brandishing a sword, trampling on a saber with the hindpaws, the lion, crowned and armed, the weapons hilted and the armour garnished gold, the blades and the armour silver, the field strewn with nine roses of silver. (This is, however, a direct translation from Finnish; the heraldic blazon would be Gules, a lion crowned Or rampant striking with a sword Argent on his armoured dexter arm, trampling on a sabre Argent; surmounted with nine roses Argent)

The coat of arms appears on the Finnish state flag. The Finnish lion is also used in a wide variety of emblems of different state authorities, often modified to depict the duties of the unit or the authority. On the other hand, the Finnish municipalities and regions usually use heraldic motifs drawn from elsewhere, leaving the lion for state use (exceptions exist, such as the Coat of arms of Jakobstad). The Finnish lion also appears as an armed force's generals' rank insignia and in the navy as part of an officer's rank insignia.

See also 
 Flag of Finland
 Finnish national symbols
 Armorial of sovereign states

References 

Vide also Dr Antti Matikkala, 'Finnish Heraldic Bookplates', The Heraldic Craftsman, No. 87, January 2015, www.heraldic-arts.com

Bibliography 

 Talvio, Tuukka. The Lion of Finland. .

External links 

 ThisisFINLAND – Finnish Coat of Arms
 Information from the Finnish Ministry of Interior on the arms of Finland

National symbols of Finland
Finnish heraldry

Finland
Finland
Finland
Finland
Finland